Beverley Breuer is a Canadian actress who has worked in television and film.

Filmography

Film

Television

References

External links
 

Year of birth missing (living people)
Living people
Canadian film actresses
Canadian television actresses